A deep-focus earthquake in seismology (also called a plutonic earthquake) is an earthquake with a hypocenter depth exceeding 300 km. They occur almost exclusively at convergent boundaries in association with subducted oceanic lithosphere. They occur along a dipping tabular zone beneath the subduction zone known as the Wadati–Benioff zone.

Discovery 

Preliminary evidence for the existence of deep-focus earthquakes was first brought to the attention of the scientific community in 1922 by Herbert Hall Turner. In 1928, Kiyoo Wadati proved the existence of earthquakes occurring well beneath the lithosphere, dispelling the notion that earthquakes occur only with shallow focal depths.

Seismic characteristics 

Deep-focus earthquakes give rise to minimal surface waves. Their focal depth causes the earthquakes to be less likely to produce seismic wave motion with energy concentrated at the surface. The path of deep-focus earthquake seismic waves from focus to recording station goes through the heterogeneous upper mantle and highly variable crust only once. Therefore, the body waves undergo less attenuation and reverberation than seismic waves from shallow earthquakes, resulting in sharp body wave peaks.

Focal mechanisms 

The pattern of energy radiation of an earthquake is represented by the moment tensor solution, which is graphically represented by beachball diagrams. An explosive or implosive mechanism produces an isotropic seismic source. Slip on a planar fault surface results in what is known as a double-couple source. Uniform outward motion in a single plane due to normal shortening gives rise is known as a compensated linear vector dipole source. Deep-focus earthquakes have been shown to contain a combination of these sources. The focal mechanisms of deep earthquakes depend on their positions in subducting tectonic plates.  At depths greater than 400 km, down-dip compression dominates, while at depths of 250-300 km (also corresponding to a minimum in earthquake numbers vs. depth), the stress regime is more ambiguous but closer to down-dip tension.

Physical process 
Shallow-focus earthquakes are the result of the sudden release of strain energy built up over time in rock by brittle fracture and frictional slip over planar surfaces. However, the physical mechanism of deep focus earthquakes is poorly understood. Subducted lithosphere subject to the pressure and temperature regime at depths greater than 300 km should not exhibit brittle behavior, but should rather respond to stress by plastic deformation. Several physical mechanisms have been proposed for the nucleation and propagation of deep-focus earthquakes; however, the exact process remains an outstanding problem in the field of deep earth seismology.

The following four subsections outline proposals which could explain the physical mechanism allowing deep focus earthquakes to occur. With the exception of solid-solid phase transitions, the proposed theories for the focal mechanism of deep earthquakes hold equal footing in current scientific literature.

Solid-solid phase transitions 

The earliest proposed mechanism for the generation of deep-focus earthquakes is an implosion due to a phase transition of material to a higher density, lower volume phase. The olivine-spinel phase transition is thought to occur at a depth of 410 km in the interior of the earth. This hypothesis proposes that metastable olivine in oceanic lithosphere subducted to depths greater than 410 km undergoes a sudden phase transition to spinel structure. The increase in density due to the reaction would cause an implosion giving rise to the earthquake. This mechanism has been largely discredited due to the lack of a significant isotropic signature in the moment tensor solution of deep-focus earthquakes.

Dehydration embrittlement 

Dehydration reactions of mineral phases with high weight percent water would increase the pore pressure in a subducted oceanic lithosphere slab. This effect reduces the effective normal stress in the slab and allow slip to occur on pre-existing fault planes at significantly greater depths that would normally be possible. Several workers suggest that this mechanism does not play a significant role in seismic activity beyond 350 km depth due to the fact that most dehydration reactions will have reached completion by a pressure corresponding to 150 to 300 km depth (5-10 GPa).

Transformational faulting or anticrack faulting 

Transformational faulting, also known as anticrack faulting, is the result of the phase transition of a mineral to a higher density phase occurring in response to shear stress in a fine-grained shear zone. The transformation occurs along the plane of maximal shear stress. Rapid shearing can then occur along these planes of weakness, giving rise to an earthquake in a mechanism similar to a shallow-focus earthquake. Metastable olivine subducted past the olivine-wadsleyite transition at 320--410 km depth (depending on temperature) is a potential candidate for such instabilities. Arguments against this hypothesis include the requirements that the faulting region should be very cold, and contain very little mineral-bound hydroxyl. Higher temperatures or higher hydroxyl contents preclude the metastable preservation of olivine to the depths of the deepest earthquakes.

Shear instability / thermal runaway 

A shear instability arises when heat is produced by plastic deformation faster than it can be conducted away. The result is thermal runaway, a positive feedback loop of heating, material weakening and strain-localisation within the shear zone. Continued weakening may result in partial melting along zones of maximal shear stress. Plastic shear instabilities leading to earthquakes have not been documented in nature, nor have they been observed in natural materials in the laboratory. Their relevance to deep earthquakes therefore lies in mathematical models which use simplified material properties and rheologies to simulate natural conditions.

Deep focus earthquake zones

Major zones

Eastern Asia/Western Pacific 
On the border of the Pacific Plate and the Okhotsk and Philippine Sea Plates is one of the most active deep focus earthquake regions in the world, creating many large earthquakes including the  8.3 2013 Okhotsk Sea earthquake. As with many places, earthquakes in this region are caused by internal stresses on the subducted Pacific Plate as it is pushed deeper into the mantle.

Philippines 
A subduction zone makes up most of the border of Philippine Sea Plate and Sunda Plate, the fault being partially responsible for the uplift of the Philippines. Notable deep-focus earthquakes in this region include a  7.7 earthquake in 1972 and the  7.6, 7.5, and 7.3 2010 Mindanao earthquakes.

Indonesia 
Notable deep-focus earthquakes in this region include a  7.9 earthquake in 1996, and a  7.5 earthquake in 2007.

Papua New Guinea/Fiji/New Zealand 
By far the most active deep focus faulting zone in the world is that caused by the Pacific Plate subducting under the Australian Plate, Tonga Plate, and Kermadec Plate. The large area of subduction results in a broad swath of deep-focus earthquakes centered from Papua New Guinea to Fiji to New Zealand, although the angle of the plates' collision causes the area between Fiji and New Zealand to be the most active, with earthquakes of  4.0 or above occurring on an almost daily basis. Notable deep-focus earthquakes in this region include a  8.2 and 7.9 earthquake in 2018, and a  7.8 earthquake in 1919.

Andes 
The subduction of the Nazca Plate under the South American Plate, in addition to creating the Andes mountain range, has also created a number of deep faults under the surfaces of Colombia, Peru, Brazil, Bolivia, Argentina, and even as far east as Paraguay. Earthquakes frequently occur in the region at depths of up to  beneath the surface. Several large earthquakes have taken place here, including the  8.2 1994 Bolivia earthquake (631 km deep), the  8.0 1970 Colombia earthquake (645 km deep), and  7.9 1922 Peru earthquake (475 km deep).

Minor zones

Granada, Spain 
Roughly  under the city Granada in southern Spain, several large earthquakes have been recorded in modern history, notably including a  7.8 earthquake in 1954, and a  6.3 earthquake in 2010. As Spain isn't near to any known subduction zones, the exact cause for the continual earthquakes remains unknown.

Tyrrhenian Sea 
Due to the lack of shallow earthquakes, the faulting is believed to originate from an ancient subduction zone that began subducting less than 15 million years ago, and largely finished around 10 million years ago, no longer visible on the surface. Due to the calculated subduction rate, the cause for subduction was likely to be internal stressing on the Eurasian Plate, rather than due to the collision of the African and Eurasian Plates, the cause of modern-day subduction for the nearby Aegean Sea and Anatolian microplates.

Afghanistan 
In northeastern Afghanistan, a number of medium-intensity deep focus earthquakes of depths of up to  occasionally occur. They are caused by the collision and subduction of the Indian Plate under the Eurasian Plate, the deepest earthquakes centered on the furthest subducted sections of the plate.

South Sandwich Islands 
They are caused by the subduction of the South American Plate under the South Sandwich Plate.

Notable deep-focus earthquakes 

The strongest deep-focus earthquake in seismic record was the magnitude 8.3 Okhotsk Sea earthquake that occurred at a depth of 609 km in 2013. The deepest earthquake ever recorded was a small 4.2 earthquake in Vanuatu at a depth of 735.8 km in 2004. However, although unconfirmed, an aftershock of the 2015 Ogasawara earthquake was found to have occurred at a depth of 751 km.

References

Plate tectonics
Types of earthquake